Rudal Rai is an Indian politician. He was elected to the Bihar Legislative Council in Bihar in the Elected by Legislative Assembly Members as a member of the Janata Dal (United).

References

Living people
Members of the Bihar Legislative Council
Janata Dal (United) politicians
People from Nalanda district
Year of birth missing (living people)